Blended Value refers to an emerging conceptual framework in which non-profit organizations, businesses, and investments are evaluated based on their ability to generate a blend of financial, social, and environmental value. The term is usually attributed to Jed Emerson, and sometimes used interchangeably with triple bottom line. Blended value propositions are founded on the notion that value cannot be bifurcated, and is inherently made up of more than one measurement of performance. For example, under a blended value proposition, a for-profit business would consider their social and environmental impact on society alongside their financial performance measurement. Within the same context, non-profits would consider their financial efficiency  and sustainability in tandem with their social and environmental performance. Blended value suggests the true measure of any organization is in its ability to holistically perform in all 3 areas.

Blended Value In Action

Five silos of Blended Value
Blended value activity is most apparent within five sectors, or “silos”, in which organizations are more likely to intentionally seek a blend of social, environmental and financial elements of performance. The five silos are:

 Social Enterprise: Enterprises that use business skills and concepts to have a meaningful and sustainable social impact.  Rather than maximizing profit, social enterprises try to enrich the lives of people who are poor, sick or disenfranchised. 
 Impact Investing: private investors in pursuit of financial, social, and environmental returns providing capital to sustainable enterprises with a social mission.
 Strategic Philanthropy: Strategic Philanthropy is an approach to philanthropic giving not as simply charitable donations, but rather taking an investing discipline for the creation of social value.
 Corporate Social Responsibility Programs: CSR describes companies and business managers/leaders who consciously integrate strategies that seek to create environmental and social value within side programs, operations and supply chains. CSR may also be manifest in terms of how a company manages its investments and philanthropy.
 Sustainable Development: Guiding principle of global development that places emphasis on environmental sustainability, and improving the economic and social conditions of the developing world.

Blended Value Business models
Organizations that incorporate Blended Value business models are actively seeking to maximize their value to society while maximizing their financial efficiency. An example is a fair trade coffee cooperative, which creates social value through the guaranteed minimum prices paid to coffee farmers and direct community development investments. Their model's ability to yield blended value depends on its financial viability. Blended value suggests that all 3 components (social, financial, and environmental) must be integrated into any value assessment.

Supply Chains 
A business model's supply chain is also considered when assessing their blended value creation. Under the blended value framework, an apparel company, for example, that sources its clothes from a sweatshop factory—like the factory involved in the 2013 Savar building collapse—would generate a low level of social value. Blended value propositions dictate organizations (for-profit and non-profit alike) should actively try to choose suppliers who also generate high blended value; to continue the example above, an apparel company that sources from a fair trade certified textile manufacturer would yield a high level of blended value.

Blended Value in Investing 
Emerson proposed the term “Blended Value” within the context of impact investing  to describe the various categories of returns an investor should be looking for. Emerson posits the idea that measuring investments purely in terms of financial returns is a disingenuous assessment of reality because there are social and environmental implications to any business activity. There is a slight distinction between a business model that generates blended value, and an investment creating blended value. The difference can be explained through the concept of additionality. Additionality is the added value that can be attributed to the investment (i.e. if an investment has high level of additionality, then a large part of the organizations impact can be isolated and attributed to that specific injection of capital).  This isolation is meant to convey how exactly the capital from the investment creates varying levels of value. Organizations gather data in order to report their performance to their investors. When investors seek blended value, they look for social, environmental, and financial returns. Although there is no single standardized measurement system to define these returns for investors, efforts are being taken by organizations such as GIIN and GIIRS   to create a set of measurement tools and metrics that make holistic assessment of investments more feasible. The current systems include:
 IRIS - Impact Reporting and Investment Standards
 GIIRS Ratings 
 SROI- Social Return on Investment
PULSE.

References
 

Business models
Social finance
Social economy